"Five Minutes" is a country music song written by Beth Nielsen Chapman. It was recorded by Lorrie Morgan for her debut album Leave the Light On, and released as the album's fourth single. In April 1990, the song became Morgan's first number one hit on the Billboard Hot Country Singles & Tracks chart.

It was also recorded by Pam Tillis in the late 1980s during her tenure on Warner Bros. Records, but was not issued on an album until the 1994 Pam Tillis Collection.

Chart performance

Year-end charts

References

Songs written by Beth Nielsen Chapman
1990 singles
Lorrie Morgan songs
Song recordings produced by Barry Beckett
Pam Tillis songs
RCA Records singles
Year of song missing
1989 songs